Jamshidabad-e Mirza (also Romanized as Jamshīdābād-e Mīrzā) is a village in Zagheh Rural District, Zagheh District, Khorramabad County, Lorestan Province, Iran. At the 2006 census, its population was 31, in 8 families.

References 

Towns and villages in Khorramabad County